The 1993–94 season was the 105th season in existence for Sheffield United, during which they played in the Premier League under manager Dave Bassett.  With little money to spend to improve the side it was a season of struggle which ended in relegation.

Players

Squad

Left club during season

Squad statistics

|}

League table

Results

FA Premier League

FA Cup

League Cup

References

Sheffield United
Sheffield United F.C. seasons